Cylindera dromicoides is a species of ground beetle of the subfamily Cicindelinae. It is flightless and has been found mainly along the Himalayas from India (west to Himachal Pradesh) through Nepal and Bhutan and in the Chinese province of Yunnan.

Adults of the species emerge with the pre-monsoon rains. The head and upper thorax are bright coppery with green, bronze or purple sheens. Along the suture, the elytra are smooth and there are two large lateral spots.

References

dromicoides
Beetles described in 1852
Beetles of Asia